The 2001–02 season is Real Oviedo's first season back in second division of the Spanish football league, the Segunda División, and the 76th as a football club.

Players

First-team quad
 Esteban
 Jaime
 Javier Gurrutxaga
 Daniel Amieva
 Boris
 Oli
 Geni
 Ángel Pérez
 Óscar Álvarez
 Viktor Onopko
 Rubén Reyes
 Albert Nađ
 Rubén Suárez Del Río
 Pablo Díaz
 Sergio Santamaría
 Javier Paredes
 Đorđe Tomić
 Iván Ania
 José Jorge Saavedra Muñoz
 Óscar Pérez
 Sanchez Tomas
 Pedro Dorronsoro
 Pablo Suárez
 Raúl García

Competitions

Overall record

Serie A

League table

Results summary

Results by round

Matches

Source:

Copa del Rey

References

Real Oviedo seasons
Oviedo